Syed Haroon Ahmed Sultan Bokhari is a Pakistani politician who was a Member of the Provincial Assembly of the Punjab, from 2002 to May 2018.

Early life and education
He was born on 2 February 1972 in Multan.

He has a degree of Master of Business Administration which he obtained in 2002 from University of Liverpool.

Political career
He was elected to the Provincial Assembly of the Punjab as a candidate of Pakistan Muslim League (Q) from Constituency PP-258 (Muzaffargarh-VIII) in 2002 Pakistani general election. He remained Provincial Minister of Punjab for Livestock and Dairy Development from 2003 to 2007.

He was re-elected to the Provincial Assembly of the Punjab as an independent candidate from Constituency PP-258 (Muzaffargarh-VIII) in 2008 Pakistani general election.

He was re-elected to the Provincial Assembly of the Punjab as a candidate of Pakistan Muslim League (Nawaz) from Constituency PP-258 (Muzaffargarh-VIII) in 2013 Pakistani general election. In June 2013, he was inducted into the provincial cabinet of Chief Minister Shahbaz Sharif and was made Provincial Minister of Punjab for Auqaf and Religious Affairs. He remained Minister for Auqaf and Religious Affairs until the cabinet reshuffle in November 2016 when he was made Provincial Minister of Punjab for Social Welfare and Bait-ul-Maal. In December 2016, his ministerial portfolio was changed to Housing, Urban Development and Public Health Engineering.

References

Living people
Punjab MPAs 2013–2018
1972 births
Pakistan Muslim League (N) politicians
Punjab MPAs 2002–2007
Punjab MPAs 2008–2013